"When Love & Hate Collide" is a power ballad by British rock band Def Leppard from their 1995 greatest hits album Vault, written by Joe Elliott and Rick Savage. It was originally written and demoed for Adrenalize, but not finalized until 1995 for its inclusion on Vault. The demo version is much more heavily produced in the signature style of Hysteria and Adrenalize, and the final version is more stripped down, supposedly toward the style of the following studio album Slang. The original demo version contains the final recorded guitar solo by late original guitarist Steve Clark. "When Love & Hate Collide" became one of their most successful singles in their homeland, where it reached number two in the UK Singles Charts, but it failed to make a significant impact on the US charts, reaching number 58 on the Billboard Hot 100. It did, however, become a top 10 hit in Canada, climbing to number six on the RPM Top Singles chart. The song also reached the top spot in Ireland.

In 2008, the song was re-recorded this time with featured vocals of American singer-songwriter Taylor Swift. The original version was re-released as a digital download on 12 February 2013.

Background
"When Love & Hate Collide" was written by lead singer Joe Elliott and bassist Rick Savage in 1990 during the composition and recording sessions for the band's fifth studio album Adrenalize. According to Elliott on the liner notes on the band's Best of compilation, the song was written when guitarist Steve Clark was in rehab. The band then went into the studio and recorded a rough demo of the song, which turned out to feature Clark's final recorded guitar solo before he died in 1991.

The song was ultimately left off the track listing for Adrenalize with the band preferring newly-written and recorded "Have You Ever Needed Someone So Bad" according to guitarist Phil Collen. According to Elliott on the Adrenalize Deluxe Edition liner notes, the inclusion of the song would have been "one ballad too many."

The song resurfaced whilst the band were recording their sixth studio album Slang in 1994. According to new guitarist Vivian Campbell on the Best of liner notes, their record label wanted a "syrupy-sounding" single for a possible compilation album, but they had "nothing at all in that vein". So the band sent over the demo to the label. As "the suits at the label really loved it", the band took a break from the production of Slang to record a new version of the song. According to Collen, the new recording took two weeks to complete, "which was really good for us".

Elliott said to a fan question "Why did it take so long to release Vault?" during a late 1995 promotional appearance on the MuchMusic programme Intimate & Interactive  that the band had not come to fully agreeing to that decision until July of that year. Before the decision had come, "When Love & Hate Collide" was in consideration for Slang and the possibility of being its lead single. The decision to release Vault instead allowed the band to fully "close the door" on the Steve Clark era and to continue working on Slang.

Video
There are 3 different versions to this video, all of which are available on DVD:
 Band-only version (most commonly used version available on Visualize / Video Archive DVD)
 4-minute "epic" version (available on Visualize/Video Archive DVD and Best of the Videos DVD, this version features future Survivor: The Australian Outback contestant Jerri Manthey)
 8-minute condensed epic version (available on Best of the Videos DVD as a bonus feature)

Track listings
CD: Mercury / Bludgeon Riffola / PY 840 / 852 429-2 / LC-7179 (UK)
 "When Love & Hate Collide"
 "Rocket"
 "Armageddon It"

CD: Mercury / Bludgeon Riffola /  422 852 424-2 (US)
 "When Love & Hate Collide"
 "Can't Keep Away From the Flame"

Cassette: Mercury / Bludgeon Riffola /  LEPMC 14 (UK) / 852 401-4 (INT)
 "When Love & Hate Collide"
 "Pour Some Sugar on Me"

CD: Mercury / Bludgeon Riffola /  LEPCD 14 (UK) / 852 401-2 (INT)
 "When Love & Hate Collide"
 "Pour Some Sugar on Me"
 "Armageddon It"
 "When Love & Hate Collide" (original demo with Steve Clark's final solo)

CD: Mercury / Bludgeon Riffola /  LEPDD 14 / PY 940 / LC 7179 (UK)

 "When Love & Hate Collide"
 "Rocket"
 "Excitable"

CD: Mercury / Bludgeon Riffola /  LEPCJ 14 (UK) / Not for Resale
 "When Love & Hate Collide" (album version) - 4:16
 "When Love & Hate Collide" (A/C mix) - 4:17
 "When Love & Hate Collide" (no strings) - 4:17

Personnel

Def Leppard 

 Joe Elliott - lead vocals, producer
 Phil Collen - lead guitar, backing vocals, producer
 Vivian Campbell - rhythm guitar, backing vocals, producer (1995 final recording)
 Steve Clark - rhythm guitar, guitar solo (1990 demo)
 Rick Savage - bass, backing vocals, producer
 Rick Allen - drums, producer

Additional personnel 

 Pete Woodroffe – producer, engineer (1995 final recording)
 Michael Kamen – string arrangements (1995 final recording)
 Stevie Vann – backing vocals
 Randy Kerber – piano (1995 final recording)
 Nigel Green – engineer (1990 demo)

Charts

Weekly charts

Year-end charts

Release history

References

Def Leppard songs
1990s ballads
1995 singles
1995 songs
Irish Singles Chart number-one singles
Mercury Records singles
Rock ballads
Songs written by Joe Elliott
Songs written by Rick Savage